Leptophryne is a small genus of true toads, family Bufonidae, with only three species. The genus is found in Southeast Asia, in the Malay Peninsula (including Peninsular Thailand) and the Greater Sunda Islands. Its relationships within Bufonidae are uncertain; its closest relative might be Epidalea.

Species
Three species are recognized in this genus:

References

External links
  Taxon Leptophryne at https://web.archive.org/web/20080501142231/http://data.gbif.org/welcome.htm

 
Amphibian genera
Taxa named by Leopold Fitzinger